WFVY (100.1 FM, "Froggy Valley 100.1") is a commercial radio station licensed to serve Lebanon, Pennsylvania. The station is owned by Seven Mountains Media with a country music format. WFVY also broadcasts local high school sporting events, and Hershey Bears hockey games.

WFVY shares studios with sister station WLBR (1270 AM). Both stations were owned by the Lebanon Broadcasting Company prior to the sale to Forever Media.

History
The Federal Communications Commission granted Lebanon Broadcasting Company a construction permit a new FM station on 104.1 MHz on July 26, 1947, with the WLBR-FM call sign. The station signed on for the first time in 1948. On March 24, 1949, the FCC reassigned the station to 100.1 MHz. The FCC then granted the station its first license on April 15, 1949.

The station's call sign was changed to WUFM effective October 29, 1974. The format changed to soft rock.

On November 27, 1992, the station changed call signs to WQIC, rebranded as "Q-100" and changed to a Top-40/Hot AC hybrid format. "Q-100" was an affiliate of Open House Party. In March 1997, the station dropped the "Q-100" branding and returned to an Adult Contemporary format.

After over 70 years of family ownership, Lebanon Broadcasting president Robert Etter announced on August 23, 2019, that he would be selling WLBR and WQIC to Holidaysburg-based Forever Media for $1.225 million. The transaction was finalized on December 31, 2019.

On February 25, 2020, the station's call sign was changed to WFVY. Despite this, the station continued to use WQIC in its branding for a short time.

On May 19, 2020, WFVY changed formats from adult contemporary to country, branded as "Froggy Valley 100.1".

It was announced on October 12, 2022 that Forever Media is selling 34 stations, including WFVY and WLBR, to State College-based Seven Mountains Media for $17.3 million. The deal closed on January 2, 2023.

Previous logo

References

External links

FVY
Radio stations established in 1949
1949 establishments in Pennsylvania
Country radio stations in the United States